Khalid bin Abu Bakar (born 5 September 1957) is a retired Malaysian police officer who served as the 10th Inspector-General of Police of Malaysia (IGP), succeeding Ismail Omar. He retired as IGP on 4 September 2017 and was succeeded by Mohamad Fuzi Harun. A day after he retired from the police, Khalid was appointed chairman of Prasarana Malaysia by the Prime Minister of Malaysia, Najib Razak.

Shortly after the fall of Najib Razak's administration in the May 2018 Malaysian general election, Khalid was put on a foreign-travel ban blacklist by the new administration, together with 11 others, in relation to investigations into the 1Malaysia Development Berhad scandal. And on 17 July 2018, Khalid resigned as chairman of Prasarana Malaysia without citing any reason.

Educational background 
He holds a Bachelor of Law degree from International Islamic University Malaysia which he earned in 1995 after being selected as one amongst 15 junior police officers to further their education through a part-time degree program.

Career 
Khalid began his career in the Royal Malaysian Police on 5 December 1975, aged 18, when he enrolled as an Inspector in Training at the Police Training Centre of Malaysia in Kuala Lumpur.He was promoted to Assistant Superintendent of Police in 1 December 1986. Khalid also attended International Senior Police Officers' Command Course in 2000.

He served as the Deputy Inspector-General of Police of Malaysia before being promoted to the top job in 2013.

As the IGP, Khalid was known for his extensive use of Twitter for public communication including issuing informal warnings via Twitter to the Malaysian public. This earned him criticism from civil rights activists who accused him of using Twitter to curb free speech.

In April 2018, Khalid was found liable for the defamation of Nurul Izzah Anwar, vice-president of the opposition People's Justice Party, for portraying her as a traitor in 2013 during statements made as IGP about the Lahad Datu standoff.  

Khalid was appointed as the new Prasarana Malaysia Bhd (Prasarana) group chairman on 5 September 2017, a day after he officially handed over his police command. Additionally, on the same day, Prime Minister Najib appointed Khalid as his special envoy in matters relating to combating terrorism, extremism and human trafficking on the international stage. 

He resigned as chairman of Prasarana on 17 July 2018, without citing reasons.

Honours
  :
  Companion of the Order of the Defender of the Realm (JMN) (2009)
  Commander of the Order of Loyalty to the Crown of Malaysia (PSM) – Tan Sri (2012)
  Commander of the Order of the Defender of the Realm (PMN) – Tan Sri (2014)
 Royal Malaysia Police :
  Warrior of the Most Gallant Police Orders (PPP)
 Loyal Commander of the Most Gallant Police Order (PSPP)
 Courageous Commander of the Most Gallant Police Order (PGPP) (2011)
  :
 Companion of the Order of Sultan Ahmad Shah of Pahang (SAP)
  Knight Companion of the Order of the Crown of Pahang (DIMP) – Dato' (2004)
  Knight Companion of the Order of Sultan Ahmad Shah of Pahang (DSAP) – Dato' (2006)
  Grand Knight of the Order of Sultan Ahmad Shah of Pahang (SSAP) – Dato' Sri (2010)
  :
  Knight Commander of the Order of the Crown of Selangor (DPMS) – Dato' (2008)
  Knight Grand Companion of the Order of Sultan Sharafuddin Idris Shah (SSIS) – Dato' Setia (2011)
  :
  Knight Grand Commander of the Order of the Life of the Crown of Kelantan (SJMK) – Dato' (2011)
  :
  of the Order of Loyalty to Sultan Abdul Halim Mu'adzam Shah (DHMS) – Dato' Paduka (2012)
  :
  Knight Commander of the Exalted Order of Malacca (DCSM) – Datuk Wira (2013)
  :
  Grand Commander of the Order of Kinabalu (SPDK) – Datuk Seri Panglima (2013)
  :
  Grand Knight of the Order of Loyalty to Tuanku Muhriz (SSTM) – Dato' Seri (2013)
  :
  Knight Grand Commander of the Order of Taming Sari (SPTS) – Dato' Seri Panglima (2014)

Foreign honours
 :
 First Class of the Order of Paduka Keberanian Laila Terbilang (DPKT) – Dato Paduka Seri (2016)

References 

Living people
1957 births
People from Negeri Sembilan
Malaysian people of Minangkabau descent
Malaysian people of Malay descent
Malaysian Muslims
Malaysian police officers
Malaysian police chiefs
International Islamic University Malaysia alumni
Companions of the Order of the Defender of the Realm
Grand Commanders of the Order of Kinabalu
Commanders of the Order of Loyalty to the Crown of Malaysia
Commanders of the Order of the Defender of the Realm
Knights Commander of the Order of the Crown of Selangor